Vaymusha is a rural locality (a village) in Karkogorskoye Rural Settlement of Pinezhsky District, Arkhangelsk Oblast, Russia. The population was 723 as of 2010. There are  7 streets present in the locality.

Geography 
Vaymusha is located on the Pinega River, 5 km southeast of Karpogory (the district's administrative centre) by road. Karpogory is the nearest rural locality.

References 

Rural localities in Pinezhsky District